Leonard Mudie (born Leonard Mudie Cheetham; April 11, 1883April 14, 1965) was an English character actor whose career lasted for nearly fifty years. After a successful start as a stage actor in England, he appeared regularly in the US, and made his home there from 1932. He appeared in character roles on Broadway and in Hollywood films.

Life and career

Early years
Leonard Mudie Cheetham was born in Cheetham Hill, a suburb of Manchester, England, the son of Thomas Hurst Cheetham and Lucy Amy Mudie. He made his stage debut with Annie Horniman's company at the Gaiety Theatre, Manchester in 1908. He remained with the company for several seasons, in a wide range of roles including Humphrey in The Knight of the Burning Pestle, Verges in Much Ado About Nothing, Alan Jeffcoate in the première of Hindle Wakes, Joseph Surface in The School for Scandal, Gordon Jayne in The Second Mrs. Tanqueray and Walter How in  Justice.

In The Manchester Guardian, James Agate commented on Mudie's acting in 1909, "[He] has a definite and genuine feeling for the stage. His enunciation is very faulty, his accent not good … but the acting instinct is there." With the Horniman company Mudie made his London and American debuts.

In 1914 and 1915 Mudie appeared at the Opera House, Boston in The Merry Wives of Windsor, Julius Caesar, The Merchant of Venice, and Twelfth Night. In 1916 he appeared at the New Amsterdam Theatre, New York in The Merry Wives of Windsor, playing Justice Shallow to the Falstaff of Sir Herbert Tree. For the next five years he appeared on Broadway and on tour in the US in modern plays, including a run playing Abraham Lincoln in a play based on the politician's life (1921), and another playing Brian Strange in A.A. Milne's Mr Pim Passes By (1922).

Film career

Mudie made his film debut in a Boris Karloff film, The Mummy in 1932. He moved to Hollywood in that year, and lived there for the rest of his life. He played a range of screen parts, some substantial, and others short cameos. Among the bigger roles were Dr Pearson in The Mummy, Porthinos in Cleopatra (1934), Maitland in Mary of Scotland (1936), and De Bourenne in Anthony Adverse (1936). His small roles, according to The New York Times, were typically "a bewigged, gimlet-eyed British judge".

Mudie made the postwar transition into television, and appeared in four episodes of Adventures of Superman, in roles ranging from the comedic to the sinister. For the postwar cinema he played the regular character Commander Barnes in the series of Bomba, the Jungle Boy films. Mudie's final acting role was as one of the elderly survivors of a wrecked spaceship in “The Cage”, the first pilot episode of Star Trek, which was filmed in 1964 but not broadcast on television in full until 1988.

Partial filmography

 A Message from Mars (1921) – Fred Jones
 Through the Storm (1922) – Jeremiah
 The Mummy (1932) – Professor Pearson
 Voltaire (1933) – Morteau (uncredited)
 Dark Hazard (1934) – Birdy—Australian Tout (uncredited)
 Mandalay (1934) – Police Lieutenant (uncredited)
 The Mystery of Mr. X (1934) – Mr. X
 The House of Rothschild (1934) – Tax Collector in Prussia
 Viva Villa! (1934) – Statesman (uncredited)
 Cleopatra (1934) – Pothinos
 The Painted Veil (1934) – Barrett – Townsend's Secretary (uncredited)
 The Little Minister (1934) – Villager (uncredited)
 Clive of India (1935) – General Burgoyne
 Les Misérables (1935) – Priest Counselling Released Prisoners (uncredited)
 Cardinal Richelieu (1935) – Olivares
 Becky Sharp (1935) – Tarquin
 Top Hat (1935) – Flower Salesman (uncredited)
 Rendezvous (1935) – Roberts
 A Feather in Her Hat (1935) – Hyde Park Orator (uncredited)
 The Great Impersonation (1935) – Mangan
 Captain Blood (1935) – Baron Jeffreys
 Sylvia Scarlett (1935) – Train Steward (uncredited)
 Professional Soldier (1935) – Radical (uncredited)
 Magnificent Obsession (1935) – Dr. Bardendreght (uncredited)
 The Story of Louis Pasteur (1936) – Coachman (uncredited)
 Mary of Scotland (1936) – Maitland
 Anthony Adverse (1936) – De Bourrienne
 His Brother's Wife (1936) – Pete
 Lloyd's of London (1936) – Waiter
 Stolen Holiday (1937) – Wedding Guest (uncredited)
 Lost Horizon (1937) – Foreign Secretary with Prime Minister (uncredited)
 The King and the Chorus Girl (1937) – Footman
 Thin Ice (1937) – Chauffeur (scenes deleted)
 Shall We Dance (1937) – Room Service Waiter (uncredited)
 The League of Frightened Men (1937) – Prof. Hibbard
 Parnell (1937) – Conservative Member (uncredited)
 Another Dawn (1937) – Army Doctor (uncredited)
 They Won't Forget (1937) – Judge Moore
 London by Night (1937) – Squires
 Madame X (1937) – Prosecutor Valmorin (uncredited)
 Lancer Spy (1937) – Statesman
 A Damsel in Distress (1937) – Bit Role (uncredited)
 You're a Sweetheart (1937) – Critic (uncredited)
 The Jury's Secret (1938) – District Attorney
 The Adventures of Robin Hood (1938) – the town crier and as an eye-patched man stealthily telling men to meet Robin at the Gallows Oak (uncredited)
 Kidnapped (1938) – Red Fox
 The Rage of Paris (1938) – Uncle Eric (uncredited)
 When Were You Born (1938) – Frederick 'Fred' Gow (Scorpio)
 Marie Antoinette (1938) – Man Yelling 'Have You Proof?' (uncredited)
 Letter of Introduction (1938) – Critic (uncredited)
 Mysterious Mr. Moto (1938) – Monk (uncredited)
 The Mad Miss Manton (1938) – Managing Editor (uncredited)
 Suez (1938) – Campaign Manager
 Arrest Bulldog Drummond (1938) – Richard Gannett
 Dramatic School (1938) – Bishop Cauchon in "Joan of Arc" (uncredited)
 Devil's Island (1939) – Advocate General
 Nancy Drew... Reporter (1939) – Deputy District Attorney (uncredited)
 The Story of Vernon and Irene Castle (1939) – British Officer (uncredited)
 Dark Victory (1939) – Dr. Driscoll
 Chasing Danger (1939) – Fort Chadran Lieutenant (uncredited)
 Man About Town (1939) – Gibson, Arlington's Secretary (uncredited)
 The Adventures of Sherlock Holmes (1939) – Barrows – Moriarty's Attorney (uncredited)
 Tropic Fury (1939) – J.T.M. Gallon
 Rulers of the Sea (1939) – Mr. Barton (uncredited)
 The Earl of Chicago (1940) – Mr. Allington (uncredited)
 Congo Maisie (1940) – Farley
 British Intelligence (1940) – James Yeats
 Charlie Chan's Murder Cruise (1940) – Gerald Pendleton
 Waterloo Bridge (1940) – Thomas Parker (uncredited)
 Brother Orchid (1940) – English Diamond Salesman (uncredited)
 The Sea Hawk (1940) – Castle Sentry (uncredited)
 Foreign Correspondent (1940) – McKenna
 He Stayed for Breakfast (1940) – Communist Secretary (uncredited)
 A Dispatch from Reuters (1940) – Member of Parliament (uncredited)
 The Letter (1940) – Fred (uncredited)
 South of Suez (1940) – Registrar
 You'll Find Out (1940) – Real Karl Fenninger (uncredited)
 Rage in Heaven (1941) – Prison Priest (uncredited)
 Scotland Yard (1941) – Clerk (uncredited)
 The People vs. Dr. Kildare (1941) – Dr. Sterling (uncredited)
 Singapore Woman (1941) – The Doctor (uncredited)
 The Nurse's Secret (1941) – Hugo
 Shining Victory (1941) – Mr. Foster
 Skylark (1941) – Jewelry Clerk
 Berlin Correspondent (1942) – George – English Prisoner
 Random Harvest (1942) – Old Man Witnessing Accident (uncredited)
 Appointment in Berlin (1943) – MacPhail (uncredited)
 Dragon Seed (1944) – Old Peddler Selling Poison (uncredited)
 Winged Victory (1944) – Minor Role (uncredited)
 The Corn Is Green (1945) – Station Master (uncredited)
 The Scarlet Clue (1945) – Horace Karlos (uncredited)
 Divorce (1945) – Harvey Hicks
 My Name Is Julia Ross (1945) – Peters (uncredited)
 Don't Gamble with Strangers (1946) – Robert Elliot
 The Locket (1946) – Hickson – Air Raid Warden (uncredited)
 The Private Affairs of Bel Ami (1947) – Potin
 Bulldog Drummond at Bay (1947) – Meredith
 Escape Me Never (1947) – Doctor in London (uncredited)
 Song of My Heart (1948) – Conductor
 The Checkered Coat (1948) – Jerry
 A Connecticut Yankee in King Arthur's Court (1949) – Mayor's Aide (uncredited)
 Challenge to Lassie (1949) – Constable with Net (uncredited)
 The Sword of Monte Cristo (1951) – Court Physician
 Royal Wedding (1951) – Singing Doorman (uncredited)
 Lorna Doone (1951) – Calvin Oates Sr. (uncredited)
 When Worlds Collide (1951) – British U.N. Representative (uncredited)
 Elephant Stampede (1951) – Andy Barnes
 The Son of Dr. Jekyll (1951) – Pharmacist (uncredited)
 African Treasure (1952) – Andy Barnes
 Limelight (1952) – Calvero's Doctor
 Bomba and the Jungle Girl (1952) – Commissioner Andy Barnes
 Abbott and Costello Meet Captain Kidd (1952) – Capt. Bonney's First Mate (uncredited)
 The Magnetic Monster (1953) – Howard Denker
 Perils of the Jungle (1953) – Grubbs
 Safari Drums (1953) – Deputy Commissioner Andy Barnes
 The Golden Idol (1954) – Commissioner Andy Barnes
 King Richard and the Crusaders (1954) – Physician (uncredited)
 Killer Leopard (1954) – Deputy Commissioner Andy Barnes
 The Black Shield of Falworth (1954) – Friar Edward
 Bengal Brigade (1954) – Pariah (uncredited)
 The Silver Chalice (1954) – Stall Keeper (uncredited)
 Kiss Me Deadly (1955) – Athletic Club Clerk (uncredited)
 Lord of the Jungle (1955) – Commissioner Andy Barnes
 The Girl in the Red Velvet Swing (1955) – Man in Audience (uncredited)
 Kismet (1955) – Physician (uncredited)
 Diane (1956) – Porter (uncredited)
 Autumn Leaves (1956) – Colonel Hillyer
 The Story of Mankind (1957) – Chief Inquisitor
 The Big Fisherman (1959) – Ilderan
 Timbuktu (1959) – Mohomet Adani (uncredited)
 How to Murder Your Wife (1965) – Club Secretary (uncredited)
 The Greatest Story Ever Told (1965) – Man (uncredited)

References

External links

1883 births
1965 deaths
20th-century English male actors
Burials at Chapel of the Pines Crematory
English male stage actors
English male film actors
English male television actors
English expatriates in the United States
Male actors from Manchester
People from Cheetham Hill
British expatriate male actors in the United States